John Crompton (18 December 1921 – 4 July 2013) was an English professional footballer. Born in Hulme, Manchester, Lancashire, he was a goalkeeper for Manchester United between 1944 and 1956. He was part of the team that won the FA Cup in 1948 and the league title in 1952. During the Second World War, he played as a guest for Stockport County.

After his retirement from playing at the end of the 1955–56 season, Crompton was hired as a trainer by Luton Town, before returning to Manchester United in the wake of the Munich air disaster two years later. Luton rehired him as their manager in 1962 as a replacement for the departing Sam Bartram, but his tenure lasted just seven days and he returned to his position at Manchester United. In 1971, Crompton was named as manager of Barrow, replacing Don McEvoy, but he only lasted until the end of the season and in June 1972, he was hired by Bury as a coach. In 1973, Crompton joined Preston North End as part of fellow former Manchester United man Bobby Charlton's coaching staff. After a year with Preston, Crompton made his final return to Manchester United to take charge of the club's reserve team, a position he held for seven years before ultimately retiring from the game.

As one of the last surviving members of the 1948 FA Cup-winning team going into the 21st century, Crompton was often invited to events commemorating the club's history, including the opening of an exhibit in the club museum marking the 100th anniversary of Old Trafford. He was also president of Curzon Ashton, who in 2012 played in a friendly against a Manchester United reserve XI for the "Jack Crompton Trophy". On 4 July 2013, it was announced that Crompton had died, aged 91.

Honours
Manchester United
Football League First Division: 1951–52, 1955–56
FA Cup: 1947–48

References

External links
Profile at StretfordEnd.co.uk
Profile at MUFCInfo.com

1921 births
2013 deaths
English footballers
English football managers
People from Hulme
Footballers from Oldham
Association football goalkeepers
Manchester City F.C. players
Manchester United F.C. players
Oldham Athletic A.F.C. players
Stockport County F.C. players
Manchester United F.C. non-playing staff
Luton Town F.C. managers
Barrow A.F.C. managers
Bury F.C. non-playing staff
Preston North End F.C. non-playing staff
FA Cup Final players